George Savage may refer to:
George Savage (Scottish footballer), Scottish footballer
George Savage (footballer, born 1895) (1895–1968), English footballer
George Savage (MP) (1636–1683), member of parliament for Wareham, 1679–1683
George Savage (physician) (1842–1921), British physician
George Savage (politician) (1941–2014), member of Northern Ireland Assembly
George Savage (priest) (died 1602), Anglican priest